Arnhold Rivas Martínez (born 13 June 1989) is a Mexican former footballer. The start of his career was good; he put in impressive performances, this culminated in him earning a debut cap on the Mexico national football team, despite a seemingly bright start to his playing career, his consistently poor conduct began to be his downfall as he was loaned at first to América and then to Querétaro F.C. His poor behaviour stretched through into his time at Querétaro and the manager, Gustavo Matosas forced him to leave the team due to bad behavior along with Jairo Castillo. This decision came after a 5–0 loss to Toluca.

International Caps 
As of 24 September 2008

References

External links

1989 births
Living people
Liga MX players
Tecos F.C. footballers
Querétaro F.C. footballers
Club América footballers
Footballers from Guadalajara, Jalisco
Mexico international footballers
Mexican footballers
2009 CONCACAF U-20 Championship players
Association football forwards